Gayen, sometimes anglicised as Gain, is a Bengali surname found in the Indian subcontinent, mainly in the  Indian states of West Bengal, Odisha and Assam. In Bengali, the title Gayen (গায়েন) referred to anyone involved in the medieval bardic tradition, i.e. composition of Bengali poetry and music.

Notable people 

 Anil Kumar Gain (1919–1978), Cambridge mathematician and founder of Vidyasagar University in India, Fellow of the Royal Society
 Swapan K. Gayen, Bengali-American physicist, researcher at City University of New York
 Kaberi Gain (born 1970), author and social activist, researcher at University of Edinburgh
 Chhanda Gayen (1979–2014), first Bengali woman to climb Mount Everest
 Prasun Gain (born 1977), Bengali actor

In popular culture 

 Goopy Gayen Bagha Bayen, a classic Bengali film by Satyajit Ray

References

External links 

 The Gayen Estate - Description of the Gayen Zamindari Estate in Dhanyakuria, West Bengal

Bengali-language surnames
Bengali Hindu surnames
Indian surnames